39th Brigade or 39th Infantry Brigade may refer to:

 39 Canadian Brigade Group, a formation of the Canadian Army
 39th Mixed Brigade, a unit of the Spanish Republican Army
 39th Infantry Brigade Combat Team (United States), a unit of the United States Army

 United Kingdom
 39th Infantry Brigade (United Kingdom)
 Artillery Brigades
 39th Brigade Royal Field Artillery

See also
 39th Division (disambiguation)
 39th Regiment (disambiguation)
 39th Battalion (disambiguation)
 39th Squadron (disambiguation)